Gerty Agoston is a Hungarian-American playwright and novelist.

Personal life
Agoston; a playwright and novelist; was born in Budapest, Hungary. When she was 6 years old, she wanted to come to the United States after seeing American films. After studying in Paris, she went to New York City with her sister who had married a United States citizen. When she was in Paris, she wrote for the publication New Yorker Staats-Zeitung for 26 years and was a film correspondent for Basler Zeitung. For 3 years, Agoston was the cultural correspondent of Deutsche Presse-Agentur. She later decided to quit her journalism career for writing novels and plays.

Professional career
Agoston has written 13 novels which have been translated into multiple languages. One of her novels; My Bed Is Not For Sleeping; was banned in Australia. Other novels include I Married a Hundred Husbands and My Husband Is a Magnificent Whore. Her one-act play; For Each Man Kills; was published in the anthology The Best One-Act Plays Of 1948-1949 and her one-act play Three Parsons was published in The Best One-Act Plays Of 1950-1951. She translated German plays into English as well as American plays into German.

She was one of the subjects of Deeper Than Y, a 2006 documentary about aging and the elderly.

References

American women dramatists and playwrights
American women novelists
Writers from New York City
20th-century American dramatists and playwrights
20th-century American novelists
20th-century American women writers
Hungarian emigrants to the United States
Novelists from New York (state)
Living people
Year of birth missing (living people)
21st-century American women